Located at the University of Kentucky in Lexington, the College of Design encompasses the School of Architecture, the School of Interior Design, and the Department of Historic Preservation.

History
The College of Architecture had its origins in the 1920s as an architectural option in the College of Engineering. Professor Charles P. Graves joined the Civil Engineering faculty in 1958 charged with converting the architectural option to a professional degree program. The curriculum changed from a mathematical and applied science concentration to courses in the arts, science, humanities, architectural design and history.

In 1960, the Board of Trustees established the Department of Architecture in the College of Engineering, with the understanding that the department would be granted autonomy upon accreditation. The first class to complete the new professional degree program graduated in 1964.
The School of Architecture was established in 1965 with Professor Graves as Dean. That year, the program also received its first accreditation from the National Architectural Accrediting Board (NAAB). The School became a college in 1967.

As the college's enrollment increased it moved to temporary off-campus quarters in the Reynolds Building, an old tobacco warehouse. In 1965, the program moved to the physics building, Pence Hall. By 1971 the college grew to over four hundred students. To accommodate this growth, space in Miller Hall was given to the college and a selective admission policy was adopted.

In 1971, Professor Graves resigned as Dean to devote his time to teaching and private practice. Professor Anthony Eardley became the second Dean in 1972. Prior to coming to UK Dean Eardley served as a professor at the Architectural Association, London, England, Princeton, and The Cooper Union. In 1986, Professor Jose' R. Oubrerie became the third Dean. Dean Oubrerie previously worked as an associate of Le Corbusier and as a professor at Columbia University. David B. Mohney became the fourth Dean in 1994. He had served as Associate director of Education, IAUS, as a visiting critic at Harvard University, and is a partner of the firm of Chan and Mohney Architecture. As a result of restructuring within the university, a new College of Design was created in January, 2002 when the College of Architecture merged with the School of Interior Design. This new college included the School of Architecture, School of Interior Design and the Historic Preservation Program. To accommodate these new programs additional space was provided in Funkhouser Building and Bowman Hall.

In 2008 Michael Speaks became the first appointed Dean for the College of Design. Dean Speaks is former director of the Graduate Program and founding director of the Metropolitan Research and Design Postgraduate Program at the Southern California Institute of Architecture in Los Angeles. Speaks also heads Big Soft Orange, a Dutch-American urban research group based in Rotterdam and Los Angeles. He was the founding editor of the cultural journal Polygraph and a former editor at Architecture New York and a+u (Tokyo), and currently serves as a contributing editor for Architectural Record.

The college's main facilities are housed in historic Pence Hall, built in 1909, with additional studio and administrative spaces located in Miller Hall, Bowman Hall, and the Funkhouser Building. In 2018 the university announced plans to renovate the Reynolds Building and consolidate the College of Design at the former tobacco warehouse. The Reynolds Building was designed by architects Manley & Young and constructed in 1917 on what is now the University of Kentucky campus.

Deans
Chuck Graves was the first Dean of the College of Architecture, serving from 1965 until 1971.
Anthony Eardley was Dean of the College of Architecture from 1972 to 1986.
José R. Oubrerie was Dean of the College of Architecture from 1986 to 1992.
David Mohney was Dean of the College of Architecture from 1994 to 2002, then Dean of the College of Design from 2002 to 2008.
Dr. Michael Speaks was named Dean of the College of Design in 2008 until June 31, 2012. Ann Whiteside-Dickson, former director of the University of Kentucky School of Interior Design, served as interim dean until 2015. In 2015 Mitzi Vernon became Dean of the College of Design.

Notable graduates
Graduates have worked in the offices of Morphosis, Daniel Libeskind, SHoP Architects, Rem Koolhaas (OMA), REX, Reiser + Umemoto, Hardy Holzman Pfeiffer Associates, and other leading architects.

References

External links
 University of Kentucky College of Design

Design
Educational institutions established in 1964
1964 establishments in Kentucky